Taylorville, also known as Taylorsville or Dresser, is an unincorporated community in eastern Sugar Creek Township, Vigo County, in the U.S. state of Indiana. It is part of the Terre Haute metropolitan area. Though the United States Board on Geographic Names has officially designated the area as Taylorville, the 2010 United States Census considered the area a census designated place called Dresser.

History
Taylorville was founded in 1908, and was named after a local farmer named Taylor. A post office was established under the name Dresser in 1932, and remained in operation until it was discontinued in 1935. Residents use the names Taylorville and Dresser interchangeably.

Taylorville has historically had a reputation of being extremely poor and insular. A 1930s history of the village described it as “a breeding ground for all that was repugnant to American standards.” Residents of Taylorville have recalled being bullied as children for being from the village. Residents do acknowledge that the village is extremely close-knit but also say they are simply independent and keep to themselves.

Taylorville has declined in population in recent decades. The village is located in a floodplain and acquiring a permit to build a home in the village is difficult. As of 2013, Vigo County officials were attempting to purchase properties in Taylorville in an effort to remove residents from flood-prone residences. This plan has been met with resistance from Taylorville residents.

Geography
Located very near the Wabash River, the town is nestled between Terre Haute and West Terre Haute.

Demographics

As of the 2010 Census, the CDP of Dresser had 104 residents. All 104 residents were White and the median age was 38 years old.

References

Unincorporated communities in Indiana
Unincorporated communities in Vigo County, Indiana
Terre Haute metropolitan area